The 2011 Kobalt Tools 500 was a NASCAR Sprint Cup Series stock car race held on November 13, 2011 at Phoenix International Raceway in Avondale, Arizona. Contested over 312 laps, it was the thirty-fifth as well as the ninth race in the Chase for the Sprint Cup during the 2011 NASCAR Sprint Cup Series season.  The race was won by Kasey Kahne for the Red Bull Racing Team. Carl Edwards finished second, and Tony Stewart clinched third.

Report

Background

Phoenix International Raceway is one of five short tracks to hold NASCAR races; the others are Richmond International Raceway, Dover International Speedway, Bristol Motor Speedway, and Martinsville Speedway. After the February race, PIR was significantly reconfigured. The first two turns are now banked from 10 to 11 degrees, while the final two turns are banked from 8 to 9 degrees. The front stretch, the location of the finish line, is banked at three degrees. The back stretch, nicknamed the 'dogleg', varies from 10 to 11 degree banking. The racetrack has seats for 76,800 spectators.

Before the race, Carl Edwards led the Drivers' Championship with 2,316 points, and Tony Stewart stood in second with 2,313 points. Kevin Harvick followed in third with 2,283 points, five ahead of Matt Kenseth and 16 ahead of Brad Keselowski in fourth and fifth. Jimmie Johnson, with 2,261 was 24 points ahead of Dale Earnhardt Jr., as Jeff Gordon with 2,235 points, was six ahead of Kurt Busch, and 18 in front of Denny Hamlin. Kyle Busch and Ryan Newman was eleventh and twelfth with 2,216 and 2,213 points. In the Manufacturers' Championship, Chevrolet was leading with 235 points, 52 ahead of Ford. Toyota, with 174 points, was 18 points ahead of Dodge in the battle for third. Edwards is the race's defending champion, after winning the race in 2010.

Practice and qualifying
Two 120 minute practice sessions were held before the race on Friday. Jeff Burton was quickest with a time of 25.702 seconds in the first session, more than two-hundredths of a second faster than Kenseth. David Ragan was just off Kenseth's pace, followed by Paul Menard, Newman, and David Reutimann. A. J. Allmendinger was seventh, still within a second of Burton's time. Also in the session, Kyle Busch's team changed his car's engine after engine problems. In the second practice session, Menard was fastest with a time of 25.510 seconds, seven-hundredths of a second quicker than second-placed Edwards. Regan Smith took third place, ahead of Brian Vickers, Kyle Busch and Jamie McMurray. Stewart could only manage 36th place.

Afterward, during qualifying, forty-six cars were entered, but only forty-three were able to race because of NASCAR's qualifying procedure. Kenseth clinched his third pole position during the season, with a time of 26.258 seconds. He was joined on the front row of the grid by Allmendinger. Marcos Ambrose qualified third, Mark Martin took fourth, and Martin Truex Jr. started fifth. Stewart, one of the drivers in the Chase for the Sprint Cup, qualified eighth, while Edwards was scored ninth. The three drivers that failed to qualify for the race were Scott Riggs, David Stremme, and Andy Lally. Once the qualifying session completed, Kenseth commented, "Jimmy Fennig, had a strategy to go fast in the first practice to go out late. Even though we knew the temperature would be hotter he thought the track could be faster with more cars having run on it. A lot of people chose the opposite strategy and worked on race set-up in the first practice and did their qualifying stuff in the second practice to go out early."

Results

Qualifying

Race results

Standings after the race

Note: Only the top five positions are included for the driver standings.

References

Kobalt Tools 500
Kobalt Tools 500
NASCAR races at Phoenix Raceway
November 2011 sports events in the United States